Hollies Live Hits (stylized as Hollies. Live Hits.) is the first live album by the Hollies, released in 1977. It reached number four on the UK Album Chart.

Overview and recording
The Hollies had already planned to release a live album with Graham Nash in 1968, but the idea was not realised at the time. The recording of the show for the Hollies Live Hits album was made during a number of shows in New Zealand in January 1976. In addition to many of the band's hits from the 1960s ("Just One Look", "I Can't Let Go", "Bus Stop", "Carrie Anne" and "He Ain't Heavy, He's My Brother"), the LP also included songs from more recent Hollies albums such as Hollies (1974), Another Night (1975) and Write On (1976). Two recorded songs from the show were not used for the LP ("Boulder to Birmingham" and "Amazing Grace").

Reception
The album was advertised on British television and the original UK album cover art referred directly to the advertisement. In other countries, however, the album had a completely different cover, featuring a photo of the Hollies on stage. The album reached the top five in the UK Album chart, stayed there for 12 weeks and the Hollies were awarded a silver disc for this album.

Track listing

Personnel
The Hollies
Allan Clarke – lead vocals, guitar on Long Cool Woman ("This one features Allan on lead guitar!" heard on LP)
Tony Hicks – lead guitar 
Terry Sylvester – rhythm guitar
Bernie Calvert – bass
Bobby Elliott – drums

Additional personnel
Pete Wingfield – piano, ARP synthesizer, VOX String machine

References

1977 live albums
The Hollies albums